Jack Richon Pole, FBA, FRHistS (14 March 1922 – 30 January 2010) was a British historian of the United States. After holding posts at University College, London and the University of Cambridge, he was Rhodes Professor of American History and Institutions at the University of Oxford from 1979 to 1989.

Selected bibliography 

 Political Representation in England and the Origins of the American Republic (1966)
 Foundations of American Independence 1763-1815 (1973)
 The Pursuit of Equality in American History (1978)
 Contract and Consent: Representation and the Jury in Anglo-American Legal History (2010)

References 

 https://www.telegraph.co.uk/news/obituaries/7407991/Professor-Jack-Pole.html
 https://www.historians.org/publications-and-directories/perspectives-on-history/may-2010/in-memoriam-jack-r-pole
 https://www.independent.co.uk/news/obituaries/professor-jack-pole-eminent-scholar-best-known-for-his-work-on-the-history-of-colonial-and-revolutionary-america-1918383.html
 https://paw.princeton.edu/memorial/jack-r-pole-53
 https://casbs.stanford.edu/people/jack-r-pole
 https://www.thebritishacademy.ac.uk/documents/1496/17_Pole_1808.pdf

1922 births
2010 deaths
Fellows of the British Academy
Fellows of the Royal Historical Society
British Jews
People educated at King Alfred School, London
British Army officers
British Army personnel of World War II
Alumni of The Queen's College, Oxford
Princeton University alumni
Academics of University College London
Academics of the University of Cambridge
Academics of the University of Oxford
Fellows of Churchill College, Cambridge
Fellows of St Catherine's College, Oxford
Historians of the United States
20th-century British historians
21st-century British historians